The Salt Lake City School District (SLCSD) is the oldest public school district in Utah. Boundaries for the district are identical to the city limits for Salt Lake City. Employing about 1,300 teachers who instruct about 25,000 students K-12, the district is the ninth largest in the state, as of 2009, behind Granite, Davis, Alpine, Jordan, Canyons, Weber, Nebo, and Washington. Two of the district's high schools, East and West, are over 100 years old.

High schools 
All high schools in the Salt Lake City District serve grades 9-12. The district operates three high schools: East High School near the University of Utah serving the southwest and central-east part of the city, West High School in western downtown serving the north and west area, and Highland High School near Sugar House Park serving the southeast. Additionally, the district runs an alternative/adult education school, Horizonte High School, located on Main Street in the south central city, and the new Innovations High School, a "student centered, personalized education" school that will focus on learning through digital technology, located in the south-central part of the city attached to Salt Lake Community College South City campus.

A high school no longer extant, South High School, located at State St. and 1700 South, once served the southern part of Salt Lake City. The district built this school during the Great Depression to accommodate about 1000 students from the private LDS High School, which closed in 1931. South High was located in some of the poorer areas of Salt Lake City with a population increasingly devoid of school age children by the 1980s. Falling enrollment throughout the school district prompted the district to close the fledgling South High in 1988. Schools with older facilities, such as East and West, as well as Highland High School received students from portions of the former South High school boundaries. The district donated the South High School school building to the Salt Lake Community College, where it currently serves as its South City campus.

East High School

East High School serves grades nine through twelve. East High School was founded in 1914 and currently has an enrolled student body of 2,109. It is located at 840 S 1300 E in Salt Lake City's East Bench. The current principal is Greg Maughan. The school mascot is the leopard, and the school colors are red and white.

Highland High School

Highland High School opened in 1956 and has a student body of about 1,546. It is located at 2166 South 1700 East, next to Sugar House Park. The current principal is Jeremy Chatterton. The school mascot is the ram, and the school colors are black and white. Highland also has a long-standing rivalry with East High School.

West High School

West High School is located at 241 North 300 West in Salt Lake City. Founded in 1890 as Salt Lake High School, West High is the oldest high school in the Salt Lake School District and the second oldest in Utah. It is the highest-ranked high school in Utah according to Newsweek. West High has a student population of 2,559 under principal Ford White.  In addition to students in grades nine through twelve, West High School serves a group of 7th and 8th graders in an Extended Learning Program (ELP). The school mascot is the panther, and the school colors are red and black.

Middle schools 
There are five middle schools in the Salt Lake City School District. All middle schools in the district teach grades 7-8, except Glendale which teaches 6-8.

In addition, West High School offers grade 7 and 8 for some students as part of the "Extended Learning Program" (ELP).

K-8 schools

Elementary schools 
The district operates 27 elementary schools. Almost all elementary schools in the district serve grades K-6.  Riley, Edison, Parkview, and Mountain View serve grades K-5 (these 6th graders attend Glendale Middle).  Most elementary schools offer preschool services.

In 1999, the district approved a bond that would reconstruct 20 of the elementary schools as well as Northwest Middle School. In addition, two elementary schools were closed for the 2002–2003 school season (Rosslyn Heights in Sugar House and Lowell in The Avenues) while serving as temporary campuses for the reconstructed schools. They were originally going to choose two schools off of a list of eight to be closed, and eventually the school board decided to close Lowell and Rosslyn Heights (the latter of which was not on the list). This aroused considerable protest from parents, teachers, and even board members, and lawsuits were filed against the district. However, they failed to keep the schools open.

Charter schools
Public charter schools in the district include Open Classroom, an elementary and middle school that has been part of the district since 1977 and is currently housed in the building that once was Lowell Elementary and Open High School of Utah, established in 2009.

References

External links 

 Salt Lake City School District
 Horizonte Instruction and Training Center's website

School districts in Utah
Education in Salt Lake City